The Sierra Gorda Territory was a federal territory of Mexico. It existed between 1853 and 1857.

History
On 1 December 1853, the territory was established by president Antonio López de Santa Anna, and consisted of the Sierra Gorda, which forms part of the Sierra Madre Oriental. The states of Querétaro, San Luis Potosí, and Guanajuato ceded area for the creation of the territory. The capital was San Luis de la Paz, and comprised the municipalities of San José Iturbide, Victoria, Santa Catarina, Tierra Blanca, Xichú, Atarjea, San Ciro de Acosta, Tierranueva and San Luis de la Paz.

With the proclamation of the Constitution of 1857, two years after the fall of Santa Anna, the territory was dissolved.

References

States and territories disestablished in 1857
States and territories established in 1853
Territories of Mexico